AirBridgeCargo Airlines, LLC (Russian: ООО Авиакомпания «ЭйрБриджКарго»), part of Volga-Dnepr Group, is the largest Russian cargo airline with its head office in Moscow. It operates scheduled cargo services on routes between Russia, Asia, Europe and North America, covering more than 30 destinations worldwide.  All flights connect to their hub at Sheremetyevo International Airport in Moscow and Krasnoyarsk. It was forced to suspend all operations in the wake of sanctions against Russia as of March 2022.

History
The company entered the scheduled cargo market on 1 April 2004, when the first AirBridgeCargo branded Boeing 747 made its inaugural commercial flight on route from Beijing to Luxembourg.

As of March 2022, AirBridgeCargo was forced to suspend all operations due to sanctions against Russia which rendered the entire fleet unusable. In July 2022, the airline announced it will comply with sanctions and prepare to return 14 leased aircraft - which make out the majority of its fleet - to its lessors.

Destinations
Prior to the suspension of all services, ABC had been present in Asia, Europe and North America. It operates a scheduled freighter route network of 37 destinations as of November 2019 focused on Europe, Asia and the United States.

Fleet

Current fleet

As of December 2022, the AirBridgeCargo fleet consists of the following aircraft:

Former fleet

AirBridgeCargo formerly operated the following aircraft:

Accidents and incidents
 On September 11, 2012, an AirBridgeCargo Boeing 747-8F experienced a major engine malfunction that spread a significant amount of metallic debris on the runway. Like in a similar event during pre-flight taxi tests, the low pressure turbine shaft separated and moved the low pressure turbine (by design to avoid turbine overspeed) backwards braking on surrounding hardware.
 On July 31, 2013, an AirBridgeCargo Boeing 747-8F experienced core engine icing that caused engine malfunctions and damage to three engines near Chengdu, China, while en route to Hong Kong; the aircraft landed safely at its destination. Boeing and General Electric are working on software changes to mitigate the effects of core engine icing.

References

External links
 
 
  

Airlines of Russia
Companies based in Moscow
Airlines established in 2003
Cargo airlines of Russia
Russian companies established in 2003